The East Germany women's national field hockey team represented East Germany in women's international field hockey competitions.

The team participated once at the Friendship Games in 1984 when it won the bronze medal.

Tournament record

Friendship Games
1984 –

See also
East Germany men's national field hockey team
Germany women's national field hockey team

References

European women's national field hockey teams
National team
Former national field hockey teams
Field hockey